Botev Plovdiv II or Botev 2 is a Bulgarian professional football team based in Plovdiv. Founded in 2021, it is the reserve team of Botev Plovdiv, and currently plays in Second League, the second level of Bulgarian football.

Obliged to play one level below their main side, Botev II is ineligible for promotion to First League and also can not compete in the Bulgarian Cup.

History

2021–:Foundation
Since 2015, the Bulgarian Football Union allowed Bulgarian teams to have reserve sides in the lower regional divisions. In the beginning of 2021 Botev Plovdiv announced their intentions to create a reserve team in Second league. In May 2021, the team had doubts about starting the team, but eventually the team was officially announced on 4 June. On 7 June, Stefan Stoyanov was announced as the manager of the team, with Botev U19 team, joining the reserve team.

Players

For recent transfers, see Transfers summer 2022.
 For first team players, see Botev Plovdiv.

Out on loan

Foreign players
Bulgarian teams can register up to five players without EU citizenship, and use all of them during match days. Those non-EU nationals with European ancestry can claim citizenship from the nation their ancestors came from. If an individual doesn't have European ancestry, he can claim Bulgarian citizenship after playing in Bulgaria for 5 years.

EU Nationals

EU Nationals (Dual citizenship)
  Miroslav Georgiev
  Monir Al Badarin

Non-EU Nationals
 Samuel Akere
 Umeh Emmanuel
 Tochukwu Nadi
 Abdoulaye Traoré

Personnel

Manager history

Past seasons

League positions

References

External links
 Official website
bgclubs.eu

Botev Plovdiv
Association football clubs established in 2021
2021 establishments in Bulgaria
Botev
II